Artem Kononuk (born December 19, 1989) is a Russian sprint canoer who has competed since the late 2000s. He won a bronze medal in the K-1 200 m event at the 2009 ICF Canoe Sprint World Championships in Dartmouth.

References
Canoe09.ca profile

1989 births
Living people
Russian male canoeists
ICF Canoe Sprint World Championships medalists in kayak